Elbe-Elster is a Kreis (district) in the southern part of Brandenburg, Germany. Neighboring districts are Teltow-Fläming, Dahme-Spreewald, Oberspreewald-Lausitz, Meißen,
Nordsachsen and Wittenberg. The district has a partnership with the Märkischer Kreis.

History
The district was established in 1993 by merging the former districts (Kreise) of Finsterwalde, Bad Liebenwerda and Herzberg.

Geography
The district is named after two rivers - the Elbe river forms the western border with Saxony, the Black Elster (Schwarze Elster) is a tributary of the Elbe and runs through the district. The district is part of the Lusatia region. The fens along the Black Elster are a habitat of several rare animals, like common kingfishers, beavers and Eurasian otters.

Demography

Coat of arms

The coat of arms was granted in 1995. The lion in the bottom left derives from the county of Meissen (see Saxony), to which the southern area of the district belonged historically. The black bars derive from the Saxony-Wittenberg county as the area around Bad Liebenwerda belonged there in the past. The red bars derive from the oldest coat of arms of Brandenburg, and the bull is the symbol for the Lower Lusatia area were the district is located.

Towns and municipalities

References

External links

Official Website (German)
Touristic website